Marijan Nikolić  (born 31 October 1981) is a Croatian football player. He currently plays for NK Darda, whom he joined from Borac in July 2020.

References

External links
soccerterminal.com
 Profile
 Profile

1981 births
Living people
Sportspeople from Osijek
Association football forwards
Croatian footballers
NK Olimpija Osijek players
Nyíregyháza Spartacus FC players
Lombard-Pápa TFC footballers
NK Belišće players
NK Inter Zaprešić players
NK Kamen Ingrad players
NK Istra 1961 players
NK BSK Bijelo Brdo players
Croatian expatriate footballers
Expatriate footballers in Hungary
Croatian expatriate sportspeople in Hungary